Rampachodavaram is a census town in Alluri Sitharama Raju district of the Indian state of Andhra Pradesh. It is located in Rampachodavaram mandal of Rampachodavaram revenue division.  Rampachodavaram is known for its dense jungle and waterfalls which can be accessed by road transport only.

Geography 
It has an average elevation of 162 metres (534 ft).

Demographics 

 Census of India, Rampachodavaram had a population of 9,952 with 2,485 households. The total population constitute, 5,242 males and 4,710 females —a sex ratio of 899 females per 1000 males. 943 children are in the age group of 0–6 years, of which 458 are boys and 485 are girls, —a ratio of 1059 per 1000. The average literacy rate stands at 84.50% with 7,613 literates, significantly higher than the state average of 67.41%.

Transport 
State run APSRTC runs bus services from Rajahmundry to Rampachodavarm.
It is 40km from Rajahmundry Airport

See also 
List of census towns in Andhra Pradesh

References 

Cities and towns in Alluri Sitharama Raju district